The 1943 Campeonato Paulista da Primeira Divisão, organized by the Federação Paulista de Futebol, was the 42nd season of São Paulo's top professional football league. São Paulo won the title for the 2nd time. no teams were relegated and the top scorer was Corinthians's Hércules with 19 goals.

Championship
The championship was disputed in a double-round robin system, with the team with the most points winning the title.

Top Scores

References

Campeonato Paulista seasons
Paulista